The Jakkals is a small, agile weapon carrier and utility vehicle for airborne units of the former South African Defence Force and current South African National Defence Force. The Jakkals can be deployed by land, lifted by helicopter, air dropped and delivered via aircraft.

Weapons mounted on the Jakkals include the 106mm M40 recoilless rifle, M2 Browning heavy machine gun, various general purpose machine guns as well as acting as a tractor for the Valkiri-5 multiple rocket launcher or anti-aircraft guns such as the ZU-23-2.

It can also be deployed with a small trailer and used as a logistical support vehicle, especially for the 120mm mortars as with airborne artillery. The Jakkals has only been used in defense operations by the South African Airborne Units during the South African Border Wars.

References

Military vehicles of South Africa
Cold War military equipment of South Africa